Toliara Airport is an airport in Toliara, Atsimo-Andrefana Region, Madagascar .

Airlines and destinations

References

Airports in Madagascar
Atsimo-Andrefana